The Way of the Strong is a 1928 American silent crime drama film directed by Frank Capra.  It was produced by Harry Cohn for Columbia Pictures. The film survives through a print held in the collection of Sony Pictures Entertainment (formerly called Columbia Pictures Entertainment).

Synopsis
Handsome Williams (Mitchell Lewis) is a bootlegger who takes in the down-and-out Nora (Alice Day).  Nora eventually finds herself in the middle of a gang war between Williams and his chief rival, Tiger Louie (William Norton Bailey).

Cast
 Mitchell Lewis - Handsome Williams 
 Alice Day - Nora 
 Margaret Livingston - Marie 
 Theodore von Eltz - Dan 
 William Norton Bailey - Tiger Louie
 Willie Fung - Chinese Cook (uncredited)
 Jack Perry - One of Handsome's Henchmen (uncredited)
 Blackie Whiteford - One of Handsome's Henchmen (uncredited)

References

External links 
 

1928 films
American black-and-white films
Columbia Pictures films
Films directed by Frank Capra
American silent feature films
American crime drama films
1928 crime drama films
1920s American films
Silent American drama films